Snake Island is a 2002 South African action horror film, starring William Katt, Wayne Crawford, Kate Connor, Russel Savadier and Dawn Matthews. It was co-written, co-produced and directed by Wayne Crawford.

Premise
The film's plot revolves around a group of tourists attempting to survive on a tropical island infested with snakes.

Cast
 William Katt as Malcolm Page
 Wayne Crawford as Jake Malloy
 Kate Connor as Heather Dorsey
 Russel Savadier as Eddie Trent Jones
 Dawn Matthews as Lisa
 Milan Murray as Carrie

Reception

Buzz McClain from Allmovie called it "silly", also writing, "this handsomely produced creature feature is far from scary but is often amusing, albeit in a stomach-tightening way." Black Horror Movies.com gave the film two out of five stars, stating: "By the end, the action is so ridiculous, all I could think about was the Simpsons episode about Snake Whacking Day. You’re better off whacking something else than watching what Snake Island has to offer."

See also
List of killer snake films

References

External links
 
 
 

2002 direct-to-video films
2002 horror films
2002 films
2000s action horror films
English-language South African films
Films about snakes
Films set on fictional islands
Natural horror films
South African action horror films
2000s English-language films